Pragmatodes fruticosella is a moth of the family Gelechiidae. It is found on the Canary Islands.

The wingspan is 6.5–7.5 mm. The forewings are dirty stone-whitish, dusted with fuscous. The hindwings are grey. Adults have been recorded on wing from January to March and in May.

The larvae feed on Rubia fruticosa and Plocama pendula. They mine the leaves of their host plant. On Plocama, the mine has the form of a full-depth, transparent brown blotch with a dense clump of frass, located in the lower part of the mine. The mine on Rubia starts as a corridor filled with frass, later widening to a glassy full-depth blotch with dispersed frass. Full-grown larvae are about 3.5 mm long with a yellowish brown to reddish body and black head capsule.

References

Moths described in 1908
Litini